Wendy "Wednesday" Martin is an American author and cultural critic who writes and comments on parenting, step-parenting, female sexuality, motherhood, and popular culture. She has written several books and for The New York Times, The Atlantic, Psychology Today, The Huffington Post, Harper's Bazaar, and The Daily Telegraph.

Early life and education
Martin was born in Ann Arbor, Michigan and grew up in Grand Rapids, Michigan. She did her undergraduate work at the University of Michigan where she studied anthropology, and she received a doctorate in comparative literature and cultural studies from Yale University. Her doctoral work examined early psychoanalysis and anthropology.

Work 
Martin has taught literature and cultural studies at Yale, The New School, and Baruch College.

In May 2009, Martin's memoir about her experience as a stepmother called Stepmonster: A New Look at Why Real Stepmothers Think, Feel and Act the Way We Do was published.

After Martin moved to the Upper East Side neighborhood of Manhattan with her family in 2004, she began researching and documenting her experiences there for her next book, Primates of Park Avenue. Simon & Schuster released the book in June 2015. The memoir recounted Martin's experience living among the wealthy women, particularly stay-at-home mothers, of the Upper East Side and examined their behavior from a social researcher's perspective, inspired by the work of Jane Goodall. Primates has been translated into nine languages, as of 2018.

In her book Untrue (2018), Martin focused on female sexuality and addressing untruths about women and sex.

Martin has also written for Psychology Today, The Daily Telegraph, The New York Times, The Huffington Post, and The Atlantic.

Publications
Martin is the author of the following books and ebooks:
 Marlene Dietrich (1995)
 Stepmonster: A New Look at Why Real Stepmothers Think, Feel and Act the Way We Do (2009)
 Primates of Park Avenue: a memoir Simon & Schuster, New York (2015)
 Untrue: Why Nearly Everything We Believe About Women, Lust, and Infidelity is Wrong and How the New Science Can Set Us Free (2018)
 Boyfriends of Dorothy (2018)
 The Button (2018)
 The Switch (2019)

Reception
In May 2013, several articles were published about the practice of hiring disabled guides to avoid lines at Disney World, which Martin uncovered during her research for Primates of Park Avenue. On May 16, 2015, The New York Times published an essay by Martin in the Sunday Review section, titled Poor Little Rich Women, prior to the publication of her book Primates of Park Avenue. The article received coverage from numerous media outlets, in particular the concept of financial rewards called "wife bonuses", which Martin reported some Upper East Side wives receive from their husbands for superior domestic performance. Following the essay, commentary appeared in the New York Post and Page Six, arguing both for and against Martin's account of wife bonuses. The New York Times characterized Martin's description of wife bonuses as "disputed".

Personal life 
Martin is married to Joel Moser, a lawyer, financier, chief executive officer and adjunct professor at Columbia University, with whom she has two sons, one born in 2001 and the other in 2007. She has two step-daughters, children of Moser's first marriage.

References

Year of birth missing (living people)
Living people
Writers from Ann Arbor, Michigan
Writers from Manhattan
American memoirists
American women memoirists
Yale University alumni
Comparative literature academics
American bloggers
HuffPost writers and columnists
20th-century American non-fiction writers
20th-century American women writers
21st-century American non-fiction writers
21st-century American women writers
Writers from Grand Rapids, Michigan
University of Michigan College of Literature, Science, and the Arts alumni
Yale University faculty
The New School faculty
Baruch College faculty
American women columnists